Rockbridge State Nature Preserve is a nature reserve featuring a natural bridge located in the unincorporated community of Rockbridge in Hocking County, Ohio, United States. It is part of the Hocking Hills region, but the sandstone that forms the natural bridge is located lower in the stratigraphic sequence than that which forms most of the region's notable features.

Nature preserve 
The park's  trail system includes two loop trails, one of which passes the natural bridge, while the other passes a rock shelter. Both formations are located a short distance from the Hocking River on small tributaries. The preserve was acquired by the state of Ohio in 1978.

Natural bridge 
The natural bridge is the largest of at least 12 natural bridges in the state of Ohio. It was formed when water eroded the softer layers of Mississippian Black Hand sandstone underneath the bridge. The nearby community of Rockbridge, Ohio is named after the formation.

References

External links 
 Official website of the Rockbridge State Nature Preserve

Natural arches of Ohio
Protected areas of Hocking County, Ohio
Ohio State Nature Preserves
Landforms of Hocking County, Ohio
Protected areas established in 1978
1978 establishments in Ohio